The title Earl of Montgomery (pronounced "Mun-gum-ery") was created in the Peerage of England in 1605 for Sir Philip Herbert, younger son of the 2nd Earl of Pembroke.  The first Earl inherited the Earldom of Pembroke in 1630 from his brother, the 3rd Earl, and the two titles remain united.

 Philip Herbert, 4th Earl of Pembroke, 1st Earl of Montgomery (1584–1649)
 Philip Herbert, 5th Earl of Pembroke, 2nd Earl of Montgomery (1621–1669)
 William Herbert, 6th Earl of Pembroke, 3rd Earl of Montgomery (1642–1674)
 Philip Herbert, 7th Earl of Pembroke, 4th Earl of Montgomery (c. 1652–1683)
 Thomas Herbert, 8th Earl of Pembroke, 5th Earl of Montgomery (1656–c. 1732)
 Henry Herbert, 9th Earl of Pembroke, 6th Earl of Montgomery (1693–1750)
 Henry Herbert, 10th Earl of Pembroke, 7th Earl of Montgomery (1734–1794)
 George Augustus Herbert, 11th Earl of Pembroke, 8th Earl of Montgomery (1759–1827)
 Robert Henry Herbert, 12th Earl of Pembroke, 9th Earl of Montgomery (1791–1862)
 George Robert Charles Herbert, 13th Earl of Pembroke, 10th Earl of Montgomery (1850–1895)
 Sidney Herbert, 14th Earl of Pembroke, 11th Earl of Montgomery (1853–1913)
 Reginald Herbert, 15th Earl of Pembroke, 12th Earl of Montgomery (1880–1960)
 Sidney Charles Herbert, 16th Earl of Pembroke, 13th Earl of Montgomery (1906–1969)
 Henry George Charles Alexander Herbert, 17th Earl of Pembroke, 14th Earl of Montgomery (1939–2003)
 William Alexander Sidney Herbert, 18th Earl of Pembroke, 15th Earl of Montgomery (b. 1978)

The heir apparent is the present holder's only son Reginald Henry Michael Herbert, Lord Herbert (b. 2012).

References

Earldoms in the Peerage of England
1605 establishments in England
Noble titles created in 1605

fr:Comte de Montgomery